"Some Might Say" is a song by English rock band Oasis. It was released as the first single on 24 April 1995 from their second studio album, (What's the Story) Morning Glory? (1995). The song was written by the band's lead guitarist Noel Gallagher. "Some Might Say" provided Oasis with their first number one on the UK Singles Chart and reached the top 10 in Finland, Iceland, Ireland and Sweden. The song is also the last to feature all 5 original members, as original drummer Tony McCarroll left shortly after the song's release.

The single release was also named an EP in the Stop the Clocks booklet. It is thus one of the only Oasis singles to officially be also categorised an extended play.

Background
The track was inspired by the song "Fuzzy" by Grant Lee Buffalo. It was the last Oasis track to feature original drummer Tony McCarroll, who was asked to leave the band before the main recording sessions for (What's the Story) Morning Glory? when tensions arose between McCarroll and Noel Gallagher.

The rest of the tracks on the album feature his replacement Alan White on drums. Oasis performed the song on two episodes of Top of the Pops, the first being McCarroll's final performance with the band and the second being White's first.

Demo
"Some Might Say" was one of three songs from (What's the Story) Morning Glory? for which Noel Gallagher recorded a demo (the others being "She's Electric" and "Hey Now"). He recorded it with producer Owen Morris, who was at the time in Wales recording The Verve's A Northern Soul album; Noel used The Verve's equipment in the studio, playing guitar, the bass and the drums himself. However, no bits from the demo were eventually used in the album version; Noel played the demo to the band who then re-recorded everything, speeding up the tempo. The demo version of the song lasts 6:33 while the final version is 5:26 long.

Noel Gallagher says he prefers the demo version of "Some Might Say" to the final version, describing the demo as "dirtier and sleazier" than the Oasis version which is "more Britpop".

The demo version was later released as a bonus track on the Japanese CD single.

Album artwork
The sleeve artwork was created by Brian Cannon of Microdot. It shot on the disused platform of Cromford railway station in Derbyshire, England. The concept was based on the lyrics, "... standin' at the station, in need of education in the rain"; education being required to learn the station is disused.

It features Cannon's father with a 'sink wheelbarrow' full of fish, from the lyrics, "The sink is full of fishes". His mother with mop. Carla Knox, barmaid of his local pub (whose inclusion, Cannon has since admitted, was because he "fancied" her).  The silverware on the Knox's head is a play on the lyric, "She's got dirty dishes on her brain."  Liam Gallagher can be seen on the bridge whilst Noel can be viewed with a watering can. Matthew Sankey, Cannon's aide, plays a homeless man, a reference to the lyrics "... the man who cannot shine" and "... the man who lives in hell". 

Cannon rates the art as one of his greatest works.

Promotional video
The planned promo video for the song was cancelled due to Liam not turning up for the shoot.  Instead, a makeshift video was created using footage from the "Cigarettes & Alcohol", US "Supersonic" and UK "Whatever" videos. Noel Gallagher gave the Gibson Les Paul guitar he plays in the music video to Gerry Mckay, Gallagher's doppelgänger in the official Oasis tribute band, No Way Sis.

Track information
In an interview promoting the compilation album, Stop the Clocks, Noel stated that "Some Might Say" is the 'archetypical Oasis song' and 'defines what Oasis is'. Noel added later in the interview that along with "Some Might Say", its B-side, "Acquiesce", was also the song that defined Oasis. In the 2003 documentary Live Forever: The Rise and Fall of Brit Pop, journalist Jon Savage recalls watching Oasis perform "Some Might Say" for the first time on Top of the Pops with tears in his eyes as he believed it marked a turning point in British culture, coinciding with the May local elections where the then-Conservative Government of John Major were trounced in the local elections.

"Some Might Say" was the 31st biggest selling single of 1995 in the UK. It has sold over 458,000 copies the UK as of April 2015.

There is a banner at Etihad Stadium that reads "Some might say we will find a brighter day" in reference to the lyrics of the song.

Track listings
All songs are written by Noel Gallagher except where noted.

United Kingdom
CD single 
 "Some Might Say"
 "Talk Tonight"
 "Acquiesce"
 "Headshrinker"

7-inch and cassette single 
 "Some Might Say"
 "Talk Tonight"

12-inch single 
A1. "Some Might Say"
B1. "Talk Tonight"
B2. "Acquiesce"

Australia
CD single 
 "Some Might Say"
 "Listen Up"
 "Bring It On Down" (live)

Japan
CD single 
 "Some Might Say" – 5:27
 "Talk Tonight" – 4:21
 "Acquiesce" – 4:24
 "Headshrinker" – 4:39
 "Some Might Say" (demo) – 6:47
 "You've Got to Hide Your Love Away" (Lennon–McCartney) – 2:16

B-sides
All of the single's B-sides were included in The Masterplan album. "Talk Tonight", is one of many acoustic B-side tracks sung by Noel. It was inspired by the near-breakup of the band in Los Angeles in autumn 1994, when Noel walked out without telling anyone and headed for San Francisco. Noel was inspired to write the song after he met a girl while in San Francisco and talked to her for hours about his troubles with the band and life.

The B-side "Acquiesce" was released as part of the Stop the Clocks EP in promotion of their compilation album, Stop the Clocks.

Personnel
 Liam Gallagher – vocals, tambourine
 Noel Gallagher – lead guitar, backing vocals
 Paul Arthurs – rhythm guitar
 Paul McGuigan – bass
 Tony McCarroll – drums and percussion

Charts

Weekly charts

Year-end charts

Certifications

Appearances in other media
 "Some Might Say" is a playable track in both Guitar Hero World Tour and the European version of Guitar Hero: On Tour. The song, as it appears on Guitar Hero, is the full version without the early fade from the album edit, which is not available on any other official or promotional Oasis release.
 It is played in an episode of Jonathan Creek, "The Reconstituted Corpse".

References

1995 singles
Oasis (band) songs
Creation Records singles
Epic Records singles
Number-one singles in Scotland
Song recordings produced by Noel Gallagher
Songs written by Noel Gallagher
UK Singles Chart number-one singles